Phillips is a town in Coal County, Oklahoma, United States. The population was 135 at the 2010 census.

History 
A post office was established at Phillips, Indian Territory on April 2, 1892.  It closed on April 2, 1927.  It was named for Henry L. Phillips, a coal mine operator.  

At the time of its founding, Phillips was located in Atoka County, a part of the Pushmataha District of the Choctaw Nation.

Geography
U.S. Route 75 passes through the town, leading north  to Coalgate, the county seat, and south  to Lehigh.

Demographics

As of the census of 2000, there were 150 people, 58 households, and 41 families residing in the town. There were 64 housing units at an average density of 122.1 per square mile (47.5/km2). The racial makeup of the town was 65.33% White, 20.00% Native American, and 14.67% from two or more races. Hispanic or Latino of any race were 0.67% of the population.

There were 58 households, out of which 34.5% had children under the age of 18 living with them, 50.0% were married couples living together, 17.2% had a female householder with no husband present, and 27.6% were non-families. 24.1% of all households were made up of individuals, and 10.3% had someone living alone who was 65 years of age or older. The average household size was 2.59 and the average family size was 3.05.

In the town, the population was spread out, with 28.0% under the age of 18, 8.7% from 18 to 24, 30.7% from 25 to 44, 22.7% from 45 to 64, and 10.0% who were 65 years of age or older. The median age was 34 years. For every 100 females, there were 111.3 males. For every 100 females age 18 and over, there were 100.0 males.

The median income for a household in the town was $33,750, and the median income for a family was $36,667. Males had a median income of $47,500 versus $23,750 for females. The per capita income for the town was $13,439. There were 27.1% of families and 21.9% of the population living below the poverty line, including 15.6% of under eighteens and 12.5% of those over 64.

References

Towns in Coal County, Oklahoma
Towns in Oklahoma